Nigel Parkinson is a British cartoonist who works for D. C. Thomson & Co. Ltd and mainly draws for The Beano and The Dandy.

Biography
Parkinson is the official artist for Dennis the Menace in The Beano. His career in comics began in 1980. Over the following twenty years he worked for many British publishers including for example Fleetway drawing Thunderbirds, Stingray, Scouse Mouse and others, BBC Magazines drawing strips based on TV shows like Grange Hill, Baywatch, and as a 'ghost' artist for many titles published by D.C. Thomson. His first work for The Dandy was in 1982;  his first work for The Beano was in 1996. He started drawing Bea in October 1998. Parkinson also occasionally draws The Bash Street Kids, and was particularly active on that strip between 1999 and 2001. He also ghosted Mike Pearse's style for the spin-off strip Singled Out in BeanoMAX.

In 1998, Parkinson started work on The Dandy'''s then-new football-mad character, Owen Goal, redefining the strip and drawing it until Dandy Xtreme in 2007.

In 1999 Parkinson commenced drawing Dennis the Menace initially alternating his interpretation of the character with artist David Parkins, until 2003 and in 2010/11 with Jim Hansen, Barrie Appleby and Tom Paterson. In 2012 he was commissioned by D.C. Thomson to become the sole official Dennis artist. At the same time he was asked to draw Minnie the Minx in the Beano, which he both drew and wrote, often with Paul Palmer, before handing over the strip to him in 2016.

In 2003, The Dandy asked Parkinson to freshen up the look of the terrible toddlers Cuddles and Dimples, taking over from the original artist, Barrie Appleby and changing the appearance of the characters and the personalities of their parents. His foxy version of Cuddles and Dimples' mum has become a fan favourite.

Since 2005 Nigel Parkinson has also illustrated all of the Beano Jigsaw Puzzles and most of Dennis the Menace merchandise.

In 2008 he began drawing Puss'n'Boots and Marvo the Wonder Chicken for The Dandy and designed a new version of Lord Snooty - Lord Snooty the Third - for The Beano's 70th birthday year.

In 2010 he wrote and drew a comic strip based on comedian Harry Hill's TV Burp for The Dandy (with co-writers including Harry Hill, Sean Baldwin, David Quantick and Duncan Scott) and in 2012 a 12-week run of The Banana Bunch.

In early 2012 he asked fellow Liverpudlian Sir Paul McCartney if he would appear in the final print edition of The Dandy'', as he had said in 1963 that his ambition was to have his picture in the comic; McCartney did, and later claimed some of his friends and family thought it was a highlight of his career!

In 2013, a drawing of Mock the Week regulars Dara Ó Briain, Hugh Dennis, Andy Parsons and Chris Addison alongside Dennis was shown (and commented on) on an episode of the series.

He has also drawn adverts for Milky Way, Wenlock & Mandeville, Lego, Nesquik, and Real Construction. He drew the record sleeve for Kaiser Chiefs's single "The Angry Mob" and Count Arthur Strong's Christmas CD.

He drew the stamps collection for both Isle of Man Post office in 2018  and The Royal Mail in 2021 

He is one of the few commercial cartoonists in the UK to operate a studio system with assistants. His colour artist since 2005 is Nika Nartova.

From 2015 he began attending Comic cons regularly (having refused all but one offer, Bristol in 2008, until then) with Nika Nartova where they do sketches for attendees, give interviews and talks and demonstrations. Together and separately they have visited nearly 40 different British towns and cities including London (7 times), Edinburgh (twice), Cardiff (twice), Belfast, Manchester (3 times), Glasgow (3 times), Birmingham (3 times), Brighton, Newcastle, York, Kendal, Blackpool (4 times), Exeter (twice), Reading (three times), Leeds (twice), Cambridge, Liverpool (6 times), Bolton (3 times), Wigan (twice), Weymouth, Southport, Walsall, Dundee (twice), Loughborough, Bradford, Norwich, Nottingham, Shrewsbury, Nantwich, Buxton (twice), Blackburn, Bournemouth, Enniskillen (twice), Northwich (twice), Macclesfield (twice), Oldham and Sunderland as well as Comic Cons in Ireland, Greece and Malta.

Comic strips
The main strips that Nigel has drawn are:

References

20th-century births
British comics artists
Living people
DC Thomson Comics
Year of birth missing (living people)
The Dandy people
The Beano people
Date of birth missing (living people)
Dennis the Menace and Gnasher